Twinsburg is a suburban city in Summit County, Ohio, United States, located about halfway between Akron and Cleveland. The population was 19,248 as of the 2020 census. It is part of the Akron metropolitan area.

History
In 1817 Ethan Alling, then aged 16, came to Township Five in the tenth range of the Connecticut Land Company, also known as Millsville. He is considered the first settler of the town that would be renamed Twinsburg, and later he became the postmaster of the town, as well as a merchant, stagecoach operator, and hotel proprietor.

They sold tracts at low prices to attract other settlers. The twins offered  of land for a public square and $20 to support the town's first school on the condition that the community would change its name from Millsville to Twinsburg. They shared a business and their property. Their wives were sisters who bore the same number of children to each twin. The twins died on the same day from the same disease, and are buried together in the Locust Grove Cemetery in Twinsburg.

In 1963, the Twinsburg Historical Society was founded. It was housed in the building formerly occupied by the Twinsburg Institute (founded by Samuel Bissell and built in 1863). The museum run by the Historical Society holds pictures, papers and documents related to the area's history. Tools and artifacts used by early artisans and farmers, furniture, including domestic items, clothes, and books, as well as letters and records of Twinsburg's early days, are all showcased. The Mail Pouch Tobacco sign displayed on the barn was one of the last ones painted by the famous barn painter Harley Warrick.

Geography
According to the United States Census Bureau, the city has a total area of 32.3 km² (12.5 mi²). 32.2 km (12.4 mi) of it is land and 0.1 km (0.04 mi) of it (0.24%) is water.

Demographics

2010 census
As of the census of 2010, there were 18,795 people, 7,507 households, and 5,124 families residing in the city. The racial makeup of the city was 78.5% White, 13.4% African American, 0.1% Native American, 5.7% Asian, 0.3% from other races, and 1.9% from two or more races. Hispanic or Latino of any race were 1.2% of the population.

There were 7,507 households, of which 35.5% had children under the age of 18 living with them, 56.9% were married couples living together, 8.9% had a female householder with no husband present, 2.5% had a male householder with no wife present, and 31.7% were non-families. 27.8% of all households were made up of individuals, and 12.1% had someone living alone who was 65 years of age or older. The average household size was 2.49 and the average family size was 3.09.

The median age in the city was 41.4 years. 25.4% of residents were under the age of 18; 5.7% were between the ages of 18 and 24; 24.8% were from 25 to 44; 29.4% were from 45 to 64; and 14.5% were 65 years of age or older. The gender makeup of the city was 46.8% male and 53.2% female.

Of the city's population over the age of 25, 44.1% holds a bachelor's degree or higher.

2000 census
As of the census of 2000, there were 17,006 people, 6,641 households, and 4,695 families residing in the city. The population density was 1,366.7 people per square mile (527.8/km). There were 6,871 housing units at an average density of 552.2 per square mile (213.3/km). The racial makeup of the city was 86.93% White, 8.73% African American, 0.11% Native American, 2.95% Asian, 0.01% Pacific Islander, 0.31% from other races, and 0.96% from two or more races. Hispanic or Latino of any race were 1.03% of the population.

There were 6,641 households, out of which 35.5% had children under the age of 18 living with them, 60.7% were married couples living together, 7.7% had a female householder with no husband present, and 29.3% were non-families. 24.9% of all households were made up of individuals, and 8.6% had someone living alone who was 65 years of age or older. The average household size was 2.54 and the average family size was 3.08.

In the city the population was spread out, with 26.7% under the age of 18, 5.1% from 18 to 24, 35.5% from 25 to 44, 21.6% from 45 to 64, and 11.2% who were 65 years of age or older. The median age was 36 years. For every 100 females, there were 92.0 males. For every 100 females age 18 and over, there were 88.2 males.

Culture

Twinsburg holds a yearly festival for twins, and other multiple births, called Twins Days.  Non-twins are also welcome to attend.

This festival started in 1976 and has grown to be the world's largest annual gathering of twins, with around 3,000 sets attending annually. The festival attracts twins, multiples and their families from much of the world, many sets returning year after year.

Education
Local people come from a broad range of ethnic  and economic origins. The area's schools form three separately governed jurisdictions: Reminderville, Twinsburg Township and the City of Twinsburg. The schools have received the "Excellent with Distinction" rating for the Ohio state tests for the 2010–11 school year.

The Twinsburg City School District is composed of five schools, 4069 students, 234 classified staff and 272 certified staff. Schools in the city are as follows:

Wilcox Primary: Grades PK–1
Bissell Elementary School: Grades 2–3 and in 2016 Bissell Won the National Blue Ribbon school
Dodge Intermediate School: Grades 4–6
R. B. Chamberlin Middle School: Grades 7–8
Twinsburg High School: Grades 9–12

According to the Twinsburg City Schools, The "Old School" located on Darrow Road was the only school building in Twinsburg until 1957, and was closed as a public school in 1992. The Twinsburg campus of Kent State Geauga occupied the "Old School" building until building a new facility in 2012.  Supporters of the "Old School" have tried to have the building placed on the National Register of Historic Places, to prevent it from being torn down for redevelopment.  The building has since been torn down.  As of 2022, a vacant lot stands where the school once did.

The Japanese Language School of Cleveland (JLSC; クリーブランド日本語補習校 Kurīburando Nihongo Hoshūkō), a weekend Japanese supplementary school for Japanese nationals and Japanese Americans, previously had its office in Twinsburg. At the time it held its classes in Regina High School in South Euclid.

Twinsburg is served by the Twinsburg Public Library.

Mayors

Notable people
 Howie Chizek, radio personality, public address announcer, and philanthropist
 Scott Effross (born 1993), baseball pitcher for the New York Yankees
 Kelly Herndon, retired NFL player for the Denver Broncos, Seattle Seahawks, and Tennessee Titans
 Joe Madsen, football player
 Julia E. McConaughy (1834–1885), litterateur and author
Dorothy Runk Mennen, theatre professor
 Dan Miller, member of the boy band O-Town
 Zoltan Mesko, retired NFL player for the New England Patriots, Pittsburgh Steelers, and Cincinnati Bengals
 Kevin O'Neill, former NFL player
 James Posey, retired NBA player for seven teams and former assistant coach for the Cleveland Cavaliers
 Brad Stuver (born 1991), MLS goalkeeper for the Austin FC

References

External links
 City of Twinsburg
 Twinsburg Chamber of Commerce

Cities in Summit County, Ohio
Cities in Ohio
Populated places established in 1819
Cleveland metropolitan area